Mastax burgeoni is a species of beetle in the family Carabidae that can be found in Angola, Cameroon, Democratic Republic of Congo, Liberia, Sierra Leone, Tanzania and Zambia.

References

Mastax burgeoni
Beetles of Africa
Beetles described in 1934